Lotus Eaters is a 2011 British drama film directed by Alexandra McGuinness and starring Antonia Campbell-Hughes, Johnny Flynn and Benn Northover.  It is McGuinness' directorial debut.

Cast
Antonia Campbell-Hughes as Alice
Johnny Flynn as Charlie
Benn Northover as Felix
Liam Browne as Benedict
Amber Anderson as Suzi
Jay Choi as Lulu
Gina Bramhill as Bella
Daisy Lewis as Saskia
Cynthia Fortune Ryan as Orna
Katrena Rochell as Leni
Alex Wyndham as Marlon
Chloe Jenden as Casting Agent
Anna Bondareva as Lottie
Nicola Wren as Indira

Reception
, the film holds an 8% approval rating on Rotten Tomatoes, based on thirteen reviews with an average rating on 4.92 out of 10.

References

External links
 
 

2011 films
British drama films
2011 directorial debut films
2010s English-language films
2010s British films